Kratbjerg halt is a railway halt serving the district of Kratbjerg in the western part of the town of Fredensborg in North Zealand, Denmark.

The halt is located on the Little North Line from Helsingør to Hillerød. The train services are currently operated by the railway company Lokaltog which runs frequent local train services between Helsingør station and Hillerød station.

See also
 List of railway stations in Denmark

External links

Lokaltog

Railway stations in the Capital Region of Denmark
Railway stations opened in 2008
Railway stations in Denmark opened in the 21st century